Dušan Dragojević (born 8 December 1960) is a Bosnian luger. He competed for Yugoslavia in the men's singles event at the 1984 Winter Olympics.

References

1960 births
Living people
Bosnia and Herzegovina male lugers
Olympic lugers of Yugoslavia
Lugers at the 1984 Winter Olympics
Sportspeople from Sarajevo